Nassim Bouchema (born 5 May 1988 in Algiers) is an Algerian football player. He plays for MO Béjaïa in the Algerian Ligue Professionnelle 1.

Club career
Bouchema began his career in the junior ranks of USM Alger in 2001. In the summer of 2006, he followed his coach at USM Alger, Aïssa Slimani, to join MC Alger. In his first season with MC Alger, he finished as the top scorer in his age category, netting 22 goals.

On 15 July 2011 Bouchema signed a two-year contract with USM Alger, joining them on a free transfer from local rivals MC Alger. Two days later, he was attacked by an MC Alger fan, who struck him in the arm with a knife, requiring the player to get seven stitches.

Honours

Club
 USM Alger
 Algerian Ligue Professionnelle 1 (2): 2013-14, 2015-16
 Algerian Cup (1): 2013
 Algerian Super Cup (1): 2013
 UAFA Club Cup (1): 2013

 MC Alger
 Algerian Ligue Professionnelle 1 (1): 2009-10

References

External links
 
 

1988 births
Living people
Footballers from Algiers
Algerian footballers
Algerian Ligue Professionnelle 1 players
MC Alger players
USM Alger players
Algeria A' international footballers
CR Belouizdad players
Association football midfielders
21st-century Algerian people